3015 Candy is a background asteroid from the outer regions of the asteroid belt, approximately  in diameter. It was discovered on 9 November 1980, by British-American astronomer Edward Bowell at Anderson Mesa Station in Flagstaff, Arizona. The asteroid was named after British astronomer Michael P. Candy.

Orbit and classification 

Candy is a background asteroid that does not belong to any known asteroid family. It orbits the Sun in the outer main-belt at a distance of 2.8–4.0 AU once every 6 years and 3 months (2,276 days). Its orbit has an eccentricity of 0.17 and an inclination of 17° with respect to the ecliptic. The body's observation arc begins with a precovery taken at Goethe Link Observatory in May 1965, more than 15 years prior to its official discovery observation at Anderson Mesa.

Naming 

This minor planet was named after Michael P. Candy (1928–1994) a British astronomer and discoverer of minor planets and comets, who was a director of the Royal Greenwich Observatory and Perth Observatory. As a long-time astrometrist and orbit computer, he discovered comet C/1960 Y1 (Candy) at Greenwich, as well as the minor planet 3898 Curlewis, 3893 DeLaeter and 3894 Williamcooke. He was also president of IAU's Commission VI. The official naming citation was published by the Minor Planet Center on 22 June 1986.

Physical characteristics 

Candy is an assumed carbonaceous C-type asteroid.

Lightcurves 

Several rotational lightcurves of Candy were obtained from photometric observations by astronomer Maurice Clark. Lightcurve analysis gave a well-defined rotation period between 4.6249 and 4.62516 hours with a brightness variation between 0.50 and 1.05 magnitude. (A high brightness amplitude typically indicates that a body has a non-spheroidal shape.)

A 2016-published lightcurve, using modeled photometric data from the Lowell Photometric Database (LPD), gave a concurring period of 4.625223 hours, as well as two spin axis of (142.0°, −26.0°) and (346.0°, −70.0°) in ecliptic coordinates (λ, β). Clark's spin modeling also suggests that Candy has a retrograde rotation, and a spin axis of (306.0°, 43.0.0°), that is nearly aligned with the body's shortest axis.

Diameter and albedo 

According to the survey carried out by the NEOWISE mission of NASA's Wide-field Infrared Survey Explorer, Candy measures 24.517 kilometers in diameter and its surface has an albedo of 0.1067, while the Collaborative Asteroid Lightcurve Link assumes a standard albedo for carbonaceous of 0.057, and calculates a diameter of 33.54 kilometers based on an absolute magnitude of 11.1.

References

External links 
 Lightcurve Database Query (LCDB), at www.minorplanet.info
 Dictionary of Minor Planet Names, Google books
 Asteroids and comets rotation curves, CdR – Geneva Observatory, Raoul Behrend
 Discovery Circumstances: Numbered Minor Planets (1)-(5000) – Minor Planet Center
 
 

003015
Discoveries by Edward L. G. Bowell
Named minor planets
19801109